"Satin Doll" is a jazz standard written by Duke Ellington and Billy Strayhorn with lyrics by Johnny Mercer. Written in 1953, the song has been recorded by Ella Fitzgerald,  101 Strings, Terry Callier, and Nancy Wilson. Its chord progression is well known for its unusual use of chords and opening with a ii-V-I turnaround.

Background

Johnny Mercer was often asked to write lyrics to already popular songs. Lyrics to "Satin Doll" were written after the song was a hit in its instrumental version. Ellington used "Satin Doll" as the closing number in most of his concerts.

Other versions
 Duke Ellington – Capitol Sessions 1953–1955 (1953)
 The Gaylords – 1958
 Bill Doggett – Salute to Duke Ellington (King, 1959)
 Peggy Lee / George Shearing –  Beauty And The Beat! (Capitol Records, 1959) 
 The Coasters – One by One (1960)
 Harry James – Harry James...Today (MGM, 1960)
 Ella Fitzgerald – Ella in Hollywood (1961)
 McCoy Tyner – Nights of Ballads & Blues (1963)
 The Impressions – The Never Ending Impressions (1964)
 Blossom Dearie – Blossom Time at Ronnie's (1966)
 Kimiko Kasai – Satin Doll (CBS/Sony, 1972) - with Gil Evans Orchestra
 Bobbi Humphrey (feat. Duke Ellington, Johnny Mercer, Billy Strayhorn)  - Satin Doll (1974)
 Chicago – Chicago VIII (1974)
 Terry Callier – I Just Can't Help Myself (1974)
 Oscar Peterson and Clark Terry – Oscar Peterson & Clark Terry (1975)
 Joe Sample – The Three (1975)
 Dewey Redman – African Venus (1992)
 Dave Grusin – Homage to Duke (1993)
 Dr. John – Duke Elegant (1999)
 Hank Jones – Someday My Prince Will Come (2002)
 Buddy Emmons & Ray Pennington with the Swing Shift Band - It's All In The Swing (2005)
 Phish May 8, 1993 - Field House, University of New Hampshire, Durham, New Hampshire

See also
Montgomery-Ward bridge

References

External links
 
 "Satin Doll" Chord melody arrangement for guitar

1953 songs
1976 singles
1950s jazz standards
Songs with lyrics by Johnny Mercer
Songs with music by Duke Ellington
Songs with music by Billy Strayhorn
Ella Fitzgerald songs
Frank Sinatra songs
The Coasters songs
Jazz compositions in C major